Salida (Spanish for "Exit") is a census-designated place (CDP) in Stanislaus County, California, in the United States. As of the 2010 census, the CDP population was 13,722. It is part of the Modesto Metropolitan Statistical Area. Cultivation of almonds has historically been a significant activity in the vicinity, including a major Blue Diamond processing facility nearby. The plant is involved exclusively in processing whole brown almond kernels with a "dry" process involving no water, heat or chemicals. Salida is within the East Stanislaus Resource Conservation District which comprises  of land area and attends to a variety of environmental conservation and best management agricultural practices.

Etymology
Salida was given the Spanish name for “departure” by the Southern Pacific Railroad in 1870.

History
In 1870, the Central Pacific Railroad extended its track construction to Stanislaus County's northern exit. There they established a railroad station with the Spanish name of salida, which in English means exit. This name favorably matched with modesto because both towns have Spanish meanings. They also laid the town out in the shape of a triangle. In 2012 and 2013, initial attempts to annex Salida to Modesto were studied, but were met with protests from local residents.

Downtown
The Downtown of Salida is situated in the original town layout. Many government and commercial buildings line the sides of Broadway. In the center of Broadway there are oak trees and a walking trail.

Geography
Salida is located at  (37.709877, -121.089286).

Demographics

2010
The 2010 United States Census reported that Salida had a population of 13,722. The racial makeup of Salida was 8,479 (61.8%) White, 435 (3.2%) African American, 111 (0.8%) Native American, 669 (4.9%) Asian, 83 (0.6%) Pacific Islander, 3,134 (22.8%) from other races, and 811 (5.9%) from two or more races. Hispanic or Latino of any race were 6,426 persons (46.8%).

The Census reported that 13,649 people (99.5% of the population) lived in households, 73 (0.5%) lived in non-institutionalized group quarters, and 0 (0%) were institutionalized.

There were 3,933 households, out of which 2,134 (54.3%) had children under the age of 18 living in them, 2,570 (65.3%) were opposite-sex married couples living together, 494 (12.6%) had a female householder with no husband present, 289 (7.3%) had a male householder with no wife present.  There were 243 (6.2%) unmarried opposite-sex partnerships, and 14 (0.4%) same-sex married couples or partnerships. 427 households (10.9%) were made up of individuals, and 103 (2.6%) had someone living alone who was 65 years of age or older. The average household size was 3.47.  There were 3,353 families (85.3% of all households); the average family size was 3.72.

The population was spread out, with 4,396 people (32.0%) under the age of 18, 1,349 people (9.8%) aged 18 to 24, 4,003 people (29.2%) aged 25 to 44, 3,113 people (22.7%) aged 45 to 64, and 861 people (6.3%) who were 65 years of age or older.  The median age was 31.2 years. For every 100 females, there were 102.6 males.  For every 100 females age 18 and over, there were 100.5 males.

The homeowner vacancy rate was 2.8%; the rental vacancy rate was 6.0%.  10,395 people (75.8% of the population) lived in owner-occupied housing units and 3,254 people (23.7%) lived in rental housing units.

2000
As of the census of 2000, there were 18,070 people , 3,617 households, and 3,157 families residing in the CDP. The racial makeup of the CDP was 68.69% White, 3.38% African American, 1.28% Native American, 4.74% Asian, 0.25% Pacific Islander, 15.64% from other races and 6.03% from two or more races. Hispanic or Latino of any race were 31.07% of the population.

There were 3,617 households, out of which 55.8% had children under the age of 18 living with them, 73.0% were married couples living together, 9.4% had a female householder with no husband present and 12.7% were non-families. 8.5% of all households were made up of individuals, and 1.7% had someone living alone who was 65 years of age or older.  The average household size was 3.44 and the average family size was 3.63.

In the CDP, the population was spread out, with 36.0% under the age of 18, 7.2% from 18 to 24, 36.4% from 25 to 44, 15.3% from 45 to 64, and 5.1% who were 65 years of age or older.  The median age was 29 years. For every 100 females, there were 101.1 males.  For every 100 females age 18 and over, there were 99.6 males.

The median income for a household in the CDP was $57,874 and the median income for a family was $60,114. Males had a median income of $42,188 versus $30,521 for females. The per capita income for the CDP was $18,173. About 6.3% of families and 7.3% of the population were below the poverty line including 7.1% of those under age 18 and 13.3% of those age 65 or over.

Schools
Salida School District enrolled 2,759 students, employed 100 teachers, 112 classified and 8 administrators for the 2010-2011 school year.
Salida School District has four elementary schools and one 6th-8th grade middle school.

Modesto City Schools operates one 9-12 high school in Salida.

Elementary
Dena Boer Elementary School
4801 Gold Valley Road,
Salida, Ca 95368
209-543-8163

Sisk Elementary School
5337 Sugar Creek Lane,
Salida, Ca 95368
209-545-1671

Salida Elementary School
4519 Finney Road,
Salida, Ca 95368
209-545-9394

Middle school

Salida Middle School
5041 Toomes Rd.
Salida, CA 95368
209-545-1633

All schools are on a traditional attendance calendar.

High school
Joseph Gregori High School

Government

Salida is governed by the Stanislaus County Board of Supervisors in District 3.

Politics 
According to Salida resident, Lee Sell, there was a movement to incorporate Salida as a city during the 1950s but it failed due to lack of tax base. Incorporation discussion surfaced again in 2007.

In 1996, the City of Modesto sought to annex Salida and Wood Colony's "Beckwith Triangle" which was voted down by LAFCO. At an August 2013 Modesto Planning Commission workshop, Modesto city planners unveiled a new general plan update to annex Salida and doubled the size of land they wanted to annex in and around the Beckwith Triangle.

Terry Withrow, Stanislaus County Supervisor whose district covers Salida, authored an opinion piece which appeared in the Modesto Bee on August 20, 2011, in favor of annexing Salida to the City of Modesto. After being elected in a run-off, Modesto Mayor Garrad Marsh expressed his support of annexing Salida in his "State of the City" speech in March 2012. Both politicians met with a contentious crowd of over 200 residents who filled the Salida Municipal Advisory Council meeting room on January 29, 2013. The majority of residents spoke against annexation.

With the election of the new Modesto Mayor, Ted Brandvold, along with several new city council members, 2016 saw a "reset" to Modesto's 1995 General Plan boundaries. The 1995 General Plan includes Salida and the Beckwith Triangle area of Wood Colony, leaving the two unincorporated communities still susceptible to annexation by the City of Modesto.

Notable residents
Claude Terry, former professional basketball player
Frank Leroy Chance, member of Baseball Hall of Fame, was born in Salida
Piolin (a famous Spanish radio show conductor, he lived in Salida and owned a house as well)
Spice 1-Bay area rapper
Gregory Rayl, NASCAR driver and crew chief

References

External links
 Town web site
 KQRP.com Home Town Community Radio Station X106.1 FM KQRP-LP Salida CA

Census-designated places in Stanislaus County, California
Census-designated places in California